Nadezhda Alexandrovna Deziderieva-Buda was a Russian mezzo-soprano at the Novosibirsk Opera and Ballet Theatre (1944–1964), director of the music school in Novosibirsk and cultural figure.

Biography
Nadezhda Deziderieva-Buda was born on July 14, 1922 in Novonikolayevsk.  Her father was a teacher of Russian language and literature.

She graduated from a music school (piano class, 1940), Vocal studio at the House of Folk Art, Novosibirsk Musical School (1950) and Novosibirsk Conservatory (1960).

In 1942–1944 Deziderieva-Buda was a soloist of the Novosibirsk Radio Committee.

From 1944 to 1964 she was an opera singer of the Novosibirsk Opera Theater.

In 1964–1979 Nadezhda Alexandrovna was the head of the Children's Music School No. 1 in Novosibirsk.

She was repeatedly a deputy of the district council, worked as a freelance instructor in culture of the city party committee and led the united party organization at the department of culture of the city executive committee.

The opera singer died on December 5, 2010.

Some roles
 Olga – Eugene Onegin by Pyotr Tchaikovsky
 Siebel – Faust by Charles Gounod
 Konchakovna – Prince Igor by Alexander Borodin
 Princess – Rusalka by Alexander Dargomyzhsky
 Marina Mnishek – Boris Godunov by Modest Mussorgsky
 Lyubava Buslayevna – Sadko by Nikolai Rimsky-Korsakov

References

1922 births
2010 deaths
Novosibirsk Opera and Ballet Theatre
Musicians from Novosibirsk
Novosibirsk Conservatory alumni
Russian mezzo-sopranos